Adora Anae (born 1 October 1996) is an American volleyball player. She plays for club Panathinaikos. With the United States women's national volleyball team, she competed at the 2018 Pan American Volleyball Cup.

Career 
She played for  Kahuku H&IS and  the University of Utah.

In the 2018–19 season she signed her first professional contract, selected after a draft by the IBK Altos, in the South Korean V-League; after two years with the Asian team, she arrived in Turkey in the 2020-21 championship, playing in the cadet division with Bolu, gaining promotion to Sultanlar Ligi. She is joined Criollas de Caguas in Puerto Rico for the 2021 Liga de Voleibol Superior Femenino, winning the championship. She joined Prometej in the Ukrainian Superliha,   but was forced to leave the club prematurely, due to the Russian-Ukrainian crisis.

Clubs

References

External links 
 Adora Anae on becoming Utah women's volleyball's all-time kill leader- 'It's just overwhelming' Pac 12, Oct 8, 2017

1996 births
Living people
Utah Utes women's volleyball players
American women's volleyball players
Volleyball players from Hawaii
Expatriate volleyball players in South Korea
Expatriate volleyball players in Turkey
Expatriate volleyball players in Greece
Expatriate volleyball players in Ukraine
American expatriate sportspeople in South Korea
American expatriate sportspeople in Turkey
American expatriate sportspeople in Ukraine
American expatriate sportspeople in Greece
Outside hitters
Panathinaikos Women's Volleyball players